"Try Again" is a song by Japanese singer songwriter Mai Kuraki, taken from her third compilation album Mai Kuraki Best 151A: Love & Hope (2014). It was released on 6 February 2013 by Northern Music.  The song was written by Kuraki herself and her long-time collaborator Akihito Tokunaga.

Commercial performance
"Try Again" debuted at number 7 on the Oricon Weekly Singles Chart, selling 13,900 physical copies. The song charted on the chart for 8 weeks and has sold 20,237 physical copies, which is her lowest selling single to date.

Music video
A short version of the official music video was first released on Kuraki's official YouTube account on 18 January 2013. As of August 2022, it has received over 1.24 million views on YouTube. A full version of the video is included in the DVD accompanies limited edition of the single.

Track listing

Charts

Weekly charts

Monthly charts

Year-end charts

Certification and sales

|-
! scope="row"| Japan (RIAJ)
| 
| 20,237 
|-
|}

Release history

References

Mai Kuraki songs
Songs written by Aika Ohno
Songs with lyrics by Mai Kuraki
2013 songs
Songs with music by Akihito Tokunaga
Case Closed songs
Song recordings produced by Daiko Nagato